Super Tennis is a 1991 tennis video game for the Super NES. It released at early points in the Super Nintendo's shelf lives and uses mode 7.

Gameplay 

The game itself features three different modes: Doubles mode, World Circuit mode, and Singles mode, in which the player competes against a human or chosen computer opponent. In doubles mode, the player and a human teammate can face the CPU. Said-players can each pair with a CPU opponent, or one player can pair with a CPU opponent to face two other computer opponents. Circuit mode is the most unlike the other modes and featuring a wide range of sequential tours the player can choose to battle through each to earn ranking points, with aim to finish number one in the rankings. There are four minor tournaments and four major tournaments, each taking place on one of three surfaces that each have different effects on how the ball bounces; the tournaments are based on real-life counterparts and include nearly every world tournament in existence at that current time.

All tennis players, whether playable or the opponents, are cute, short representations of the then-top world players, though their last names are left out of the game. Each playable tennis player has their own talents on the court. Multiple of the right-hand buttons of the SNES controller perform different tennis racket moves and the direction of the ball when hit is influenced by the control pad, which also moves the player around their side of the tennis court in anticipation of the ball. Super Tennis takes time to master, as the game itself neither tells the player how to play, nor gives them any knowledge on how the many different playable characters subtly differ in play style.

Development and release

Reception 

Super Tennis was met with critical acclaim by media in the United Kingdom and North America. Mean Machines magazine declared it to be "the best tennis game available [as of October 1991]" and scored all aspects of the game very highly, from sound, to gameplay, to their impressions overall. They were impressed by the attention to detail, like how ball runners get the ball off of the court whenever it gets caught in the net. Computer and Video Games editors said that Super Tennis is "more fun than should be allowed" when a set is played against a friend. They also echoed the declaration that this was the best tennis game available up until that point.

In a 2000s retrospective, Mean Machines' then-editor Damo stated that the game was still "the best representation of the sport to date and also the most "fantastically competitive," but also said the single player was "nothing special." Super Tennis was included as one of the titles in the 2010 book 1001 Video Games You Must Play Before You Die. IGN ranked the game 84th in their "Top 100 SNES Games of All Time."  In 1995, Total! rated the game 40th on their Top 100 SNES Games. They commented that Super Tennis is superb and it does not have as many features compared to Smash Tennis and praised the gameplay as "Unbelievably slick."

Notes

References

External links 
 Super Tennis at GameFAQs
 Super Tennis at Giant Bomb
 Super Tennis at MobyGames

1991 video games
Multiplayer and single-player video games
Super Nintendo Entertainment System games
Tennis video games
Tokyo Shoseki games
Video games developed in Japan
Video games scored by Yoshiki Nishimura
Nintendo Switch Online games
Tonkin House games
Tose (company) games